In geometry, the Hessian curve is a plane curve similar to folium of Descartes. It is named after the German mathematician Otto Hesse.
This curve was suggested for application in elliptic curve cryptography, because arithmetic in this curve representation is faster and needs less memory than arithmetic in standard Weierstrass form.

Definition 

Let  be a field and consider an elliptic curve  in the following special case of Weierstrass form over :

where the curve has discriminant 
Then the point  has order 3.

To obtain the Hessian curve, it is necessary to do the following transformation: 

First let  denote a root of the polynomial

Then

Note that if  has a finite field of order , then every element of  has a unique cube root; in general,  lies in an extension field of K.  

Now by defining the following value  another curve, C, is obtained, that is birationally equivalent to E:

    

which is called cubic Hessian form (in projective coordinates)

in the affine plane (satisfying  and ).

Furthermore,   (otherwise, the curve would be singular).

Starting from the Hessian curve, a birationally equivalent Weierstrass equation is given by

under the transformations: 

and

where:             

and

Group law 

It is interesting to analyze the group law of the elliptic curve, defining the addition and doubling formulas (because the SPA and DPA attacks are based on the running time of these operations). Furthermore, in this case, we only need to use the same procedure to compute the addition, doubling or subtraction of points to get efficient results, as said above. 
In general, the group law is defined in the following way: if three points lie in the same line then they sum up to zero. So, by this property, the group laws are different for every curve.

Let  be a point on the curve. The line  contains the point  and the point at infinity . 
Therefore,  is the third point of the intersection of this line with the curve. Intersecting the elliptic curve with the line, the following condition is obtained  

Doubling

Now, if  is a point on the elliptic curve, it is possible to define a "doubling" operation using Cauchy-Desboves´ formulae:

Addition

Let  denote the sum of these points, then its coordinates are given by:

Algorithms and examples

There is one algorithm that can be used to add two different points or to double; it is given by Joye and Quisquater. Then, the following result gives the possibility the obtain the doubling operation by the addition:

Proposition. Let  be a point on a Hessian elliptic curve . Then: 

Furthermore, we have .

Finally, contrary to other parameterizations, there is no subtraction to compute the negation of a point.

To sum up, by adapting the order of the inputs according to equation (2) or (3), the addition algorithm presented above can be used indifferently for:
Adding 2 (diff.) points, Doubling a point and Subtracting 2 points with only 12 multiplications and 7 auxiliary variables including the 3 result variables. Before the invention of Edwards curves, these results represent the fastest known method for implementing the elliptic curve scalar multiplication towards resistance against side-channel attacks.

For some algorithms protection against side-channel attacks is not necessary. So, for these doublings can be faster. Since there are many algorithms, only the best for the addition and doubling formulas is given here, with one example for each one:

Addition 
Assuming that  then the algorithm is given by:

The cost needed is 8 multiplications and 3 additions readdition cost of 7 multiplications and 3 additions, depending on the first point.

Example

Then:

Doubling 
Let  be a point, then the doubling formula is given by:

The cost of this algorithm is 

Example

That is,

Extended coordinates

There is another coordinates system with which a Hessian curve can be represented; these new coordinates are called extended coordinates. They can speed up the addition and doubling. To have more information about operations with the extended coordinates see: 

http://hyperelliptic.org/EFD/g1p/auto-hessian-extended.html#addition-add-20080225-hwcd

See also
For more information about the running-time required in a specific case, see Table of costs of operations in elliptic curves
Twisted Hessian curves

External links
 http://hyperelliptic.org/EFD/g1p/index.html

Notes

References
 Otto Hesse (1844), "Über die Elimination der Variabeln aus drei algebraischen Gleichungen vom zweiten Grade mit zwei Variabeln", Journal für die reine und angewandte Mathematik, 10, pp. 68–96
 
 

Elliptic curves
Elliptic curve cryptography